Martine de Clermont-Tonnerre is a French film producer.

Filmography
 Chacun pour toi, (1993)
 Ma sœur chinoise, (1994)
 Metroland, (executive, 1997)
 Central Station, (1998)
 Cabaret Balkan, (1998)
 Der Vulkan, (1999)
 Blue Away to America, (1999)
 Unleaded, (2000)
 Comedy of Innocence, (2000)
 Philanthropy, (2002)
 Remake, (2003)
 The Living World, (2003)
 Le soleil assassiné, (2003)
 Le Pont des Arts, (2004)
 Quartier V.I.P., (2005)
 Private Property, (2006)
 Memories, (2007)
 Private Lessons, (2008)
 Nucingen House, (2008)
 Correspondances, (short, 2009)
 Sans rancune!, (2009)
 The Portuguese Nun, (2009)
 Demain?, (2011)
 Sous le figuier, (2012)
 Gebo and the Shadow, (2012)
 Le tourbillon de Jeanne, (TV, 2013)
 La Sapienza, (2014)
 Barrage, (2017)
 The Mustang, (2019)

References

French film producers
Filmmakers who won the Best Foreign Language Film BAFTA Award